Irene B. Vogel (born 1952) is an American linguist, specializing in phonology. She is a professor in the University of Delaware Linguistics and Cognitive Science Department, best known for her work on the phonology-syntax interface.

Education 
Vogel earned a BA degree in Linguistics at the University of Wisconsin (1973), Madison, and MA (1975) and PhD (1977) degrees in Linguistics at Stanford University. Her PhD dissertation is titled, The Syllable in Phonological Theory: With special reference to Italian.

Research 
Vogel's work has centered on prosody and the interface between prosody and (morpho-)syntax. Her widely cited 1986 book with Marina Nespor, Prosodic Phonology, is considered a foundational work in the field of the phonology-syntax interface. Using data drawn from many different languages, the book investigates ways in which syntax and phonology affect one another, and it proposes a cross-linguistic correspondence between prosodic domains (constituents in a Prosodic Hierarchy) and syntactic constituents within the framework of generative grammar. The book was reissued in 2007 by De Gruyter as part of their Studies in Generative Grammar series.

Other notable work by Vogel on prosody and its interfaces includes studies motivating the compound and clitic group, distinct from the word or phrase, as domains for phonological processes such as stress and vowel harmony in languages like Turkish, Hungarian, Italian (and other Romance languages).

Selected publications

References 

Women linguists
University of Delaware faculty
Phonologists
American phonologists
Stanford University School of Humanities and Sciences alumni
1952 births
Living people
University of Wisconsin–Madison alumni